Hallin's spheres is a theory of news reporting and its rhetorical framing posited by journalism historian Daniel C. Hallin in his book The Uncensored War (1986) to explain the coverage of the Vietnam war. Hallin divides the world of political discourse into three concentric spheres: consensus, legitimate controversy, and deviance. In the sphere of consensus, journalists assume everyone agrees. The sphere of legitimate controversy includes the standard political debates, and journalists are expected to remain neutral. The sphere of deviance falls outside the bounds of legitimate debate, and journalists can ignore it. These boundaries shift, as public opinion shifts.
Hallin's spheres, which deals with the media, are similar to the Overton window, which deals with public opinion generally, and posits a sliding scale of public opinion on any given issue ranging from conventional wisdom to unacceptable.

Hallin used the concept of framing to describe the presentation and reception of issues in public. For example, framing the use of drugs as criminal activity can encourage the public to consider that behavior anti-social. Hallin also used the concept of an opinion corridor, in which the range of public opinion narrows, and opinion outside that corridor moves from legitimate controversy into deviance.

Description

Sphere of consensus 

This sphere contains those topics on which there is widespread agreement, or at least the perception thereof. Within the sphere of consensus, 'journalists feel free to invoke a generalized "we" and to take for granted shared values and shared assumptions'. Examples include such things as motherhood and apple pie. For topics in this sphere, journalists feel free to be advocating cheerleaders without having to be neutral or present any opposing view point and be disinterested observers."

Sphere of legitimate controversy 

For topics in this sphere rational and informed people hold differing views within limited range. These topics are therefore the most important to cover, and also ones upon which journalists are seemingly obliged to remain disinterested reporters, rather than advocating for or against a particular view. Schudson notes that Hallin, in his influential study of the US media during the Vietnam War, argues that journalism's commitment to objectivity has always been compartmentalized. That is, within a certain sphere—the sphere of legitimate controversy—journalists seek conscientiously to be balanced and objective.

Sphere of deviance 

Topics in this sphere are rejected by journalists as being unworthy of general consideration. Such views are perceived as being out of hand unfounded, taboo, or of such minor consequence that they are not newsworthy. Hallin argues that in the sphere of deviance, 'journalists also depart from standard norms of objective reporting and feel authorized to treat as marginal, laughable, dangerous". They either avoid mentioning or ridicule the controversial subject as outside the bounds of acceptable controversy. And censor the individuals and groups who are associated with it. A simple example: a person claiming that aliens are manipulating college basketball scores might have difficulty finding sports media coverage for such a claim. A more political example: the US media regulator FCC's "Fairness Doctrine" aimed at radio stations, advocated balance between right and left political news and opinions yet specified that broadcasters didn't have to reserve any space or time for Communist viewpoints.

Uses of the terms 

Craig Watkins (2001, pp. 92–4) makes use of the Hallin's spheres in a paper examining ABC, CBS, and NBC television network television news coverage of the Million Man March, a demonstration that took place in Washington, DC on October 16, 1995. Watkins analyzes the dominant framing practices – problem definition, rhetorical devices, use of sources, and images – employed by journalists to make sense of this particular expression of political protest. He argues that Hallin's three spheres are a way for media framing practices to develop specific reportorial contexts, and each sphere develops its own distinct style of news reporting resources by different rhetorical tropes and discourses.

Piers Robinson (2001, p. 536) uses the concept in relation to debates that have emerged over the extent to which the mass media serves elite interests or, alternatively, plays a powerful role in shaping political outcomes. His article reviews Hallin's spheres as an example of media-state relations, that highlights theoretical and empirical shortcomings in the 'manufacturing consent' thesis (Chomsky, McChesney). Robinson argues that a more nuanced and bi-directional understanding is needed of the direction of influence between media and the state that builds upon, rather than rejecting, existing theoretical accounts.

Hallin's theory assumed a relatively homogenized media environment, where most producers were trying to reach most consumers. A more fractured media landscape can challenge this assumption because different audiences may place topics in different spheres, a concept related to the filter bubble, which posits that many members of the public choose to limit their media consumption to the areas of consensus and deviance that they personally prefer.

See also 

 Ambit claim
 Argument to moderation
 Creeping normality
 Cultural hegemony
 Door-in-the-face technique
 Political suicide
 Slippery slope
 Spiral of silence
 Third rail of politics
 Overton window

References

External links 

 Rosen, Jay. "Audience Atomization Overcome: Why the Internet Weakens the Authority of the Press," PressThink.org (January 12, 2009).
 Smith, Christopher. The Sphere of Deviance WNYmedia Network, 2009.
 "Does NPR have a Liberal Bias?", On the Media (New York Public Radio) (September 14, 2012). Retrieved 11 February 2013.

Framing (social sciences)
Knowledge representation
Propaganda techniques
Journalism